Pop rock is a subgenre of pop music.

Pop rock may also refer to:

 Pop Rock (horse), a Japanese racehorse
 Pop Rocks, a carbonated candy
 PopRocks, a music channel that broadcasts on Sirius XM and Dish Network
 Pop Rocks (film), a 2004 film
 Pop Rocks (EP), an EP by Head Automatica
 "Pop Rock", a song by Brooke Candy from the EP Opulence
 Pop & Rock magazine